Pilling railway station served the villages of Pilling and Stake Pool in Lancashire, England.

Under the Garstang and Knot-End Railway

The station was located on the southern edge of Stake Pool village to the east of the road running south (now Bradshaw Lane), and was sometimes called Stake Pool station by the local press.

The line was a single track and a passing loop, which appeared to cross the adjacent road on the level, was provided at the station to enable the locomotive to run round the train. At this time there was one platform to the south of the running line and a small building between the platform and the road. A small goods yard was to the south and east of the station able to accommodate most types of goods including live stock, it was equipped with a half ton crane. The initial service was for four trains in each direction.

Under the Knott End Railway
A substantially larger station building was constructed immediately south of the southern platform.

In 1922 the service had increased to six trains each way, with an extra train on Fridays to and from Knott End. There were no services on Sundays.

LMS and closure
The station closed to passengers on 31 March 1930. Despite being closed the station was still available for goods and parcels, by 1938 the crane had been upgraded to 1 ton capacity. The line and station closed for freight on 31 July 1963. In 1981 it was reported that the station goods yard was now a small industrial estate and the former station house had become a private dwelling.

References

Notes

Citations

Bibliography

Further reading

External links

Disused railway stations in the Borough of Wyre
The Fylde
Railway stations in Great Britain opened in 1870
Railway stations in Great Britain closed in 1872
Railway stations in Great Britain opened in 1875
Railway stations in Great Britain closed in 1930
Pilling